The Masonic Temple in Yakima, Washington is a historic building constructed in 1911. It was listed on the National Register of Historic Places in 1996.  For many years it served as a meeting hall for Yakima's Masonic Lodges, however no lodges meet in the building today.

References

Second Empire architecture in Washington (state)
Masonic buildings completed in 1911
Buildings and structures in Yakima, Washington
Clubhouses on the National Register of Historic Places in Washington (state)
Former Masonic buildings in Washington (state)
National Register of Historic Places in Yakima County, Washington